Ohlsen is a surname. Notable people with the surname include:

Anders Ohlsén (born 1964), Swedish canoeist
Else Ahlmann-Ohlsen (1907–1994), Danish fencer
Jürgen Ohlsen (1917–1994), German actor
Nils Ohlsen (born 1967), German curator and essayist
Russell Ohlsen (born 1955), Australian footballer

See also 
Ohlson